Jan-Ralph Brandt (born 23 January 1978) is a German former professional tennis player.

Brandt, who comes from Weiterstadt, was considered a player of promise and reached the junior doubles final at the 1996 French Open. He made his only ATP Tour main draw appearance in doubles at the 2000 Hamburg Masters and won two doubles titles on the ATP Challenger Tour.

Junior Grand Slam finals

Doubles: 1 (1 runner-up)

ATP Challenger and ITF Futures finals

Singles: 3 (1–2)

Doubles: 8 (4–4)

References

External links
 
 

1978 births
Living people
German male tennis players
People from Darmstadt-Dieburg
Sportspeople from Darmstadt (region)
Tennis people from Hesse